Whitt is a surname. It may refer to:

 Brandon Whitt (1982– ), American racing driver
 Cole Whitt (1991– ), American racing driver
 Don Whitt (1930– ), an American professional golfer
 Ernie Whitt (1952– ), former Major League Baseball catcher and coach
Jack  Whitt (born April 12, 1990) is an American pole vaulter
Joe Whitt Jr., American football coach 
Rusty Whitt, American head strength and conditioning coach
Ward Whitt (born 1942), an American professor of operations research and management sciences
W. B. Whitt, former mayor of Ashland, Kentucky

See also

 Whit (disambiguation)